Zijah Sokolović (born 22 December 1950) is a Bosnian actor, writer and director. He is the director of Theaterland in Salzburg, professor at the Anton Bruckner Private University in Linz, artistic director of Dežela gledališča theatre in Ljubljana and artistic project leader for Dramatic society, Dramatično društvo, but also directs plays in Belgrade, Zagreb, Banja Luka and in his hometown of Sarajevo.

Sokolović appeared in numerous films, including multiple award-winning Yugoslav and Bosnian films Silent Gunpowder, Remake and The Abandoned. He also voiced Mr. Ping in the Serbian dub of the Kung Fu Panda franchise.

Personal life
Sokolović is married to Lidija Stanković, and together they have a daughter named Hana Selena.

Health
On 9 November 2020, it was confirmed that Sokolović tested positive for COVID-19 and was sent to a hospital in Belgrade; by 11 November, he was let go to treat himself from home.

On 25 February 2021, he was admitted to a Banja Luka hospital because of heart problems. The next day, Sokolović was released from hospital and sent back home.

Selected filmography

Film

Television

Voice-over dubs

Awards

References

External links

Rođen Zijah Sokolović at historija.ba

1950 births
Living people
Male actors from Sarajevo
Bosnia and Herzegovina male actors
Bosniaks of Bosnia and Herzegovina
Academic staff of Anton Bruckner Private University
Bosnian expatriate actors